Autosticha lushanensis is a moth in the family Autostichidae. It was described by Kyu-Tek Park and Chun-Sheng Wu in 2003. It is found in China (Jiangxi, Hainan, Guangdong, Zhejiang) and Taiwan.

The wingspan is 17–19 mm. The forewings are brownish fuscous, densely covered with dark brown scales. There is a short dark streak at the subbase centrally and the costa is fuscous at the extreme base, almost straight and brownish orange. The first discal stigma is found at the middle, the plical obliquely below the first, and the second at the end of the cell. There is a series of brownish fuscous dots along the posterior half of the costa and termen and the tornus is suffused with brownish scales. The hindwings are grey.

Etymology
The species name is derived from the type location.

References

Moths described in 2003
Autosticha
Moths of Asia
Moths of Taiwan